The 1951–52 season was Real Madrid Club de Fútbol's 49th season in existence and the club's 20st consecutive season in the top flight of Spanish football.

Summary
During summer, President Santiago Bernabéu closed the arrivals of Zarraga forwards Joseíto reinforcing the offensive line and Uruguayan head coach Hector Scarone. On 30 March 1952 the team played a friendly match against Colombian side Millonarios marked the debut of Argentine striker Alfredo Di Stéfano in front of Madrid fans and President Santiago Bernabéu started negotiations for his transfer to the club. The squad reached a decent third place five points below Champions CF Barcelona.

During June, the squad reached 1952 Copa del Generalísimo semi-finals being defeated after two matches by Valencia CF with a global score of 2–3. Pahiño clinched the first spot on top scorers of La Liga with 28 goals.

Squad

Transfers

Competitions

La Liga

League table

Position by round

Matches

Copa del Generalísimo

Semi-finals

Statistics

Squad statistics

Players statistics

References

Real Madrid CF seasons
Real Madrid CF